Nar Bahadur Bhandari Government College, formerly Sikkim Government College, Tadong, established in 1977, is the general degree college in Gangtok, the capital of the North Indian province of Sikkim. It offers undergraduate and post graduate courses in arts, commerce and sciences and is affiliated to Sikkim University.

History
The college was established in September 1977 by an Act of State  Legislature. The campus is spread over 22 acres in Tadong, 5 km from Gangtok, the Capital of Sikkim and has good road connectivity with different districts of Sikkim and also with the neighboring state of West Bengal. The College is affiliated to Sikkim University and is governed by Directorate of Higher Education, Human Resource Development Department, Government of Sikkim. 
It  offers 19 UG courses and 5 PG courses and is affiliated to Sikkim University.

Departments

Science

Chemistry (UG Hons & PG Courses)
Physics (UG Hons & PG Courses))
Mathematics (UG Hons & PG Courses))
Botany (UG Hons & PG Courses)
Zoology(UG Hons & PG Courses)

Arts and Commerce
Economics (Postgraduate also)
Nepali
English (Postgraduate also)
Bhutia
Lepcha
Limboo
Physical Education
History (Postgraduate also)
Political Science 
Education
Commerce  
Tourism
Geography
Sociology

Accreditation
Sikkim Government College is recognized by the University Grants Commission (UGC).

Notable Persons
Rajendra Bhandari HOD Nepali Department.
Prof J.P Tamang (Botany Department)
Pankaj Thapa (english Department)

References

External links
 

Educational institutions established in 1977
Academic institutions formerly affiliated with the University of North Bengal
Colleges affiliated to Sikkim University
Universities and colleges in Sikkim
Gangtok district
1977 establishments in Sikkim